Yettem is a census-designated place (CDP) in Tulare County, California. Yettem has a post office with ZIP code 93670. The 2010 United States census reported Yettem's population was 211.

Yettem's name was Lovell until Hagop Hamalian, the town storekeeper and postmaster, along with Ezekiel Kendigian and Devlat Agha Moorsalian submitted Armenia, Ararat, and Yettem as suggestions for a name change for the town to the Post Office Department, which chose Yettem.  Yettem is how Western Armenians pronounce the Armenian word for Eden.  Although most of the Armenian population has moved away, there is still an active St. Mary's Armenian Church in Yettem.

Geography
According to the United States Census Bureau, the CDP covers an area of 0.2 square miles (0.4 km), all of it land.

Demographics
The 2010 United States Census reported that Yettem had a population of 211. The racial makeup of Yettem was 48 (22.7%) White, 5 (2.4%) African American, 0 (0.0%) Native American, 0 (0.0%) Asian, 0 (0.0%) Pacific Islander, 148 (70.1%) from other races, and 10 (4.7%) from two or more races. Hispanic or Latino of any race were 199 persons (94.3%).

The Census reported that 211 people (100% of the population) lived in households, 0 (0%) lived in non-institutionalized group quarters, and 0 (0%) were institutionalized.

There were 51 households, out of which 35 (68.6%) had children under the age of 18 living in them, 32 (62.7%) were opposite-sex married couples living together, 7 (13.7%) had a female householder with no husband present, 6 (11.8%) had a male householder with no wife present.  There were 4 (7.8%) unmarried opposite-sex partnerships, and 0 (0%) same-sex married couples or partnerships. 5 households (9.8%) were made up of individuals, and 4 (7.8%) had someone living alone who was 65 years of age or older. The average household size was 4.14.  There were 45 families (88.2% of all households); the average family size was 4.38.

The population was spread out, with 78 people (37.0%) under the age of 18, 36 people (17.1%) aged 18 to 24, 55 people (26.1%) aged 25 to 44, 32 people (15.2%) aged 45 to 64, and 10 people (4.7%) who were 65 years of age or older.  The median age was 23.8 years. For every 100 females, there were 119.8 males.  For every 100 females age 18 and over, there were 121.7 males.

The homeowner vacancy rate was 23.5%; the rental vacancy rate was 11.6%.  43 people (20.4% of the population) lived in owner-occupied housing units and 168 people (79.6%) lived in rental housing units.

References

Armenian-American history
Census-designated places in Tulare County, California
Census-designated places in California
Armenian diaspora communities in the United States